Myola is a beach-side locality in the City of Shoalhaven in New South Wales, Australia. It lies about 26 km southeast of Nowra on the northeastern shore of Jervis Bay. It is on the opposite side of Currambene Creek from Huskisson, although there is no direct road connection.

References

City of Shoalhaven